Fatikchari() is an upazila of Chattogram District in Chattogram Division, Bangladesh.

History

The Fatikchhari Jami al-Uloom Fazil Madrasa and the Jamia Arabia Nasirul Islam Madrasa were founded in 1904 and 1912 respectively, transforming Fatikchhari into an important site of spiritual activities in the country. During the British colonial period, a thana was formed in Fatikchhari in 1918. In 1928, the Nanupur Sunnia Madrasa was established.

During the Bangladesh Liberation War, a training camp was founded in Fatikchhari by Mustafizur Rahman Siddiqi, Ziaur Rahman and Zonal Commander Mirza Abu Mansur in March 1971. Bengali freedom fighters around Chittagong that used to go to India for training purposes would return through there and Fatikchhari alone was home to roughly 1500 Bengali freedom fighters. Thus Fatikchhari was regarded as the gateway to freedom fighters. Subsequently, the Abu Subhan School playground in Nanupur became a refugee camp. Mass graves were dug in Dantmara, Began Bazar, Darbar Sharif and Lelang Tea Garden.

Geography

It is one of the largest upazilas of Bangladesh. It is a fertile valley between the Sitakunda Hills and the Hills of the Chittagong Hill Tracts. These two hill ranges become one at the northernmost point of the upazila and they widen apart as they proceed southwards. There is no particular geographical place in the upazila called Fatikchhari, rather the entire upazila takes its name from one small all-season rivulet known as Fatikchhari Khal that originates in the Sitakund Hills on the West and enters the Upazila at Bhujpur Union before joining the River Halda, the longest river in Fatikchhari Upazila that runs through the upazila along almost its entire length. Dhurung is its second longest river. There are some small rivers (khals) originating from the hills both on the eastern and western flanks, all being tributaries of the Halda flowing southwards to the sea. Among them are Gazaria, Fatikchhari, Baramasia, Mandakini, Balukhali etc. In between the two hill ranges, Fatikchhari consists of flat farmland annually affected by flash floods caused by heavy rainfall in the hilly catchment areas and the water being drained by several small rivers and the Halda.

It is surrounded by Tripura (India) to the north, Hathazari and Kawkhali Upazila (Rangamati District) to the south, Ramgarh, Manikchhari, Lakshmichhari, and Raozan Upazilas on the east, Mirsharai and Sitakunda Upazilas on the west.

Demographics

According to the 1991 Bangladesh census, Fatikchhari had a population of 388,013, in 65,861 households. Males constituted 50.1% of the population, and females 49.9%. The population aged 18 or over was 182,250. Fatikchhari had an average literacy rate of 32% (7+ years), against the national average of 32.4% literate.

Around 87% of the population are Bengali Muslims with around 10% adhering to Hinduism and around 9000 adherents to Christianity. There are 191 Buddhists, most of whom are Baruas. There are populations of Tripuris, Chakmas and Mog but it is decreasing as more and more are migrating to the nearby semi-autonomous region of the Chittagong Hill Tracts. There are also the Manipuris and Oriyas who were brought over by the British during the nineteenth century to work as tea garden labourers.

Facilities

The Fatikchhari Upazila also has 7 orphanages which take care of orphan children and educate them. These include:
Muniria Islamia Orphanage & Madrasa
Talimuddin Orphanage & Madrasa
Munafkhil Uloom Hafizia Orphanage & Madrasa
Chaumuhani Bazar Orphanage & Madrasa
Manirul Uloom Hafezia Orphanage & Madrasa
Mawlana Burhan ad-Din Shah Orphanage
Imam Ghazzali Orphanage and Madrasa

Economy and tourism

18 of Bangladesh's 163 tea gardens are in Fatikchhari Upazila.

Aasia Tea Garden
Andharmanik Tea Garden
Baramasia Tea Garden
Dantmara Tea Garden
Elahi-Noor Tea Garden
Haldavalley Tea Garden
Laiyacherra Tea Garden
Karnafuli Tea Garden
Maa Jaan Tea Garden
Mohammad Nagar Tea Garden
Naseha Tea Garden
Neptune Tea Garden
New Dantmara Tea Garden
Oodaleah Tea Garden
Panchabati Tea Garden
Ramgarh Tea Garden
Rangapani Tea Garden
MMH Tea Garden

Fatikchhari is also home to many rubber gardens. The Dantmara Rubber Garden (4500 acre) is the largest rubber garden in Asia. The other rubber gardens are Tarakon Rubber Garden, Rangamatia Rubber Garden and Kanchannagar Rubber Garden. It also home to the Bhujpur Rubber Dam.

Residential Hotel 
Hotel Mount Royal is located in the heart of Fatikchhari, Chittagong and only 3.5 km away from Maiz Vandar Sharif.

 Hotel Mount Royal

Administration
Bibir Hat is the administrative centre of the Fatikchhari Upazila, not Fatikchhari. The old Fatikchhari Thana is divided into two Thanas (Police Stations) with Bhujpur created as a new thana in 2008 with its seat near Kazir Hat. 

Fatikchhari Upazila is divided into Fatikchhari Municipality, Nazirhat Municipality, and 18 union parishads: Abdullapur, Bagan Bazar, Bhujpur, Bokhtapur, Dantmara, Dharmapur, Harualchari, Jafathagar, Kanchannagor, Khiram, Lelang, Nanupur, Narayanhat, Paindong, Roshangiri, Samitirhat, Suabil, and Sunderpur. The union parishads are subdivided into 102 mauzas and 206 villages.

Education

According to Banglapedia, Fatickchari Coronation Model High School, founded in 1912; Maizbhander Ahmadia High School; Haidchakia High School, founded in 1926; Nanpur Abu Sobahan High School, founded in 1942; and Dhurung Khulshi Lion's High School, founded in 1943, are notable secondary school and Zamidar Abdul Bari Chowdhury (Abc) School 
There are five colleges in the upazila. They include Fatikchhari Degree College, founded in 1970. Another Primary School Found 1926 Anwar Ali Primary School And Now It Government Primary School Registered. Its Haji Anwar Ali Sowdagor Bari Familiar Haji Anwar Ali Sowdagor Family Inferior. Other schools include Dantmara A.B.Z Sikder High School and Fatikchhari Girls Pilot High School.

The madrasa education system includes two fazil madrasas and one kamil madrasa. Al-Jamiah Al-Islamiah Obaidia Nanupur and Al-Jamiatul Islamiah Azizul Uloom Babunagar are prominent Deobandi institutions in Fatikchhari.

Notable people
 Abdur Rahman (1920-2015), founding director of Islamic Research Center Bangladesh
 Gulamur Rahman (1865-1937), 2nd leader of the Maizbhandari Sufi order
 Harun Babunagari (1902-1986), founder of Al-Jamiatul Islamiah Azizul Uloom Babunagar
 Jamal Uddin Ahmad (1929-2016), accountant and former Deputy Prime Minister of Bangladesh
 Junaid Babunagari (1953-2021), Deobandi Islamic scholar and former Amir of Hefazat-e-Islam Bangladesh
 Muhammad Enamul Haq (1902-1982), Bangladeshi litterateur, researcher and educationist
 Muhibbullah Babunagari (b. 1935), chancellor of Al-Jamiatul Islamiah Azizul Uloom Babunagar
 Nurul Alam Chowdhury (1945-2019), diplomat and politician
 Nurul Islam Jihadi (b. 1948), Deobandi Islamic scholar and Amir of Hefazat-e-Islam Bangladesh
 Shah Sultan Ahmad Nanupuri (1914–1997), founding principal of Al-Jamiah Al-Islamiah Obaidia Nanupur
 Sufi Azizur Rahman (1862-1922), founder of Al-Jamiatul Ahlia Darul Ulum Moinul Islam
 Subrata Barua (b. 1946), Bengali writer
 Syed Ahmad Ullah (1826-1906), founder of the Maizbhandari Sufi order
 Syed Najibul Bashar Maizbhandari (b. 1959), founder of the Bangladesh Tarikat Federation

See also
Fatikchhari
Upazilas of Bangladesh
Districts of Bangladesh
Divisions of Bangladesh

References

External links
 Official Web Portal of Fatikchhari Upazila